The Stolen Jools is a 1931 American pre-Code comedy short produced by the Masquers Club of Hollywood, featuring many cameo appearances by film stars of the day. The stars appeared in the film, distributed by Paramount Pictures, to raise funds for the National Vaudeville Artists Tuberculosis Sanitarium. The UCLA Film and Television Archive entry for this film says—as do the credits—that the film was co-sponsored by Chesterfield cigarettes to support the "fine work" of the NVA sanitarium.

When the film was shown in theaters in 1931, a speaker would appear after the film to ask the audience for donations. Being made for charity, the film has an unusually large cast of actors who volunteered to appear gratis. Studios represented included Paramount, Warner Bros., RKO, MGM, and Hal Roach Studios.

This film was retitled The Slippery Pearls in the United Kingdom. In spite of copies being sold by Blackhawk Films throughout the 1970's on 16mm and Super 8 stock the film was thought by some to have been lost until a print was found in the UK in the 1990s. Another print was later found in the US under the alternative title.

Plot
At the "Screen Stars Annual Ball", Norma Shearer's jewels are stolen. The police must find them and return them to her.

Cast
The original film did not include credits. Blackhawk Films later added credits to identify the actors in the film by scene, stating "a good cast is worth introducing."

At the Police Station
Wallace Beery
Buster Keaton
Jack Hill
J. Farrell MacDonald
Edward G. Robinson
George E. Stone

The Law
Eddie Kane
Stan Laurel and Oliver Hardy

At the Victim's House
Our Gang: Farina, Stymie, Chubby, Mary Ann Jackson, Shirley Jean Rickert, Echo, Wheezer, Pete the Pup
Polly Moran
Norma Shearer
Hedda Hopper

Tete-a-Tete
Joan Crawford
William Haines

On the Porch Swing
Dorothy Lee

At Breakfast
Victor McLaglen
Edmund Lowe
El Brendel

In the Hotel
Charlie Murray
George Sidney
Winnie Lightner
Fifi D'Orsay
Warner Baxter
Irene Dunne

At Lunch
Bert Wheeler and Robert Woolsey

In the Movie Studio
Richard Dix
Claudia Dell
Lowell Sherman

The Newsmen
Eugene Pallette
Stuart Erwin
Skeets Gallagher
Gary Cooper
Wynne Gibson
Charles "Buddy" Rogers

The Detective
Maurice Chevalier

Under the Tree
Douglas Fairbanks Jr.
Loretta Young
Richard Barthelmess
Charles Butterworth

Couples at Home
Bebe Daniels and Ben Lyon
Barbara Stanwyck and Frank Fay

In a Movie Scene
Jack Oakie and Fay Wray

Projectionist
George "Gabby" Hayes

The Midget
Little Billy (Billy Rhodes)
Mitzi Green solves the mystery.

(Uncredited)
Joe E. Brown
Robert Ames
Bert Lytell

See also
List of rediscovered films

References

External links 

 
The Stolen Jools at Internet Archive

1931 films
1931 short films
1930s comedy mystery films
American black-and-white films
Our Gang films
Paramount Pictures short films
1930s rediscovered films
American comedy mystery films
Rediscovered American films
Films with screenplays by Edgar Allan Woolf
Films directed by William C. McGann
1930s English-language films
1930s American films